Karel Hartmann (6 July 1885 – c. 16 October 1944) was a Czechoslovak ice hockey player who competed in the Olympic games in 1920. He was a member of the national team that won the bronze medal in Antwerp. He and his family were killed in the Holocaust.

Biography
Hartmann was born in Trhové Dušníky into a Czech Jewish family, to parents Max and Emilie, nee Hammerschlag. His great-uncle was Moritz Hartmann. In 1922 he succeeded Paul Loicq as vice-president of the International Ice Hockey Federation. In 1923 he was appointed the President of the Czechoslovak Hockey Association On 23 July 1942, two weeks after his 57th birthday, he was transported from Prague to the Terezín Ghetto. From there on 16 October 1944, Hartmann, his wife and their two sons were transported to Auschwitz concentration camp, where Karel and Edita were most likely murdered upon arrival.

References

External links

1885 births
1944 deaths
Czech people who died in Auschwitz concentration camp
Czech Jews who died in the Holocaust
Czech ice hockey forwards
Ice hockey players at the 1920 Summer Olympics
Jewish ice hockey players
Medalists at the 1920 Summer Olympics
Olympic bronze medalists for Czechoslovakia
Olympic ice hockey players of Czechoslovakia
Olympic medalists in ice hockey
People from Příbram District
People from the Kingdom of Bohemia
Sportspeople from the Central Bohemian Region
Czech ice hockey defencemen
Czechoslovak ice hockey forwards
Czechoslovak ice hockey defencemen